West Meon railway station was an intermediate station  on the Meon Valley line which ran from Alton to Fareham during the first half of the 20th century. Opened on 1 June 1903, it formed part of a comprehensive set of transport links serving the village. The main station building was designed by T. P. Figgis.

Engineering works
The Meon Valley line was particularly difficult to construct (it cost the equivalent of 27 million pounds). The terrain around West Meon was very uneven, requiring large works of civil engineering to build the railway. In quick succession, heading into West Meon from the north, the line required a tall embankment with a large tunnel driven through it to carry it over the A272, a tunnel and, immediately before the station, an impressive wrought-iron viaduct over the Meon Valley itself.

Closure
Never a busy station, its only substantive commission was to move a complete farm in 1933. It was finally closed on 7 February 1955. The station buildings remained for several years but were eventually demolished for hard core rubble for a car park in Denmead. The four-span West Meon viaduct was demolished in 1957.

The site today
The only remains today are the  platforms which were cleared of trees in 2015 to provide a grassy area with picnic tables. An interpretation board has been installed to provide a brief description of the scene.   and an Ordnance Survey benchmark. The site of the former goods yard is now a car park for users of the Meon Valley Trail and the approach road from the village is still called 'Station Road'. The goods storage yard opposite the platform area was converted by volunteers into a wildlife area for the local primary school. A pupil won a school competition by naming the area 'The Nature Station'.

Route

See also 
 List of closed railway stations in Britain

External links 
  Details of route

References 

Disused railway stations in Hampshire
Former London and South Western Railway stations
Railway stations in Great Britain opened in 1903
Railway stations in Great Britain closed in 1955